Gauntlet is a top-down hack and slash dungeon crawl video game, developed by Arrowhead Game Studios and published by Warner Bros. Interactive Entertainment. Part of the Gauntlet series, it was released for Microsoft Windows in September 2014. Gauntlet was re-released for both Windows and PlayStation 4 as Gauntlet: Slayer Edition in August 2015.

Gameplay
The player takes the role of one of four heroes, Thor the Warrior, Thyra the Valkyrie, Merlin the Wizard, or Questor the Elf (one player per character) allowing up to four-player multiplayer co-op gameplay. The dungeons to be explored are part defined maps and part procedurally generated.

Reception

Both the original Gauntlet and Slayer Edition received "average" reviews according to the review aggregation website Metacritic. Gaming website Shacknews stated that "so far, it looks like Gauntlet properly captures much of the spirit that made the 1985 arcade game so much fun", while also stating that the game isn't very intuitive in terms of figuring out the unlocked mechanics as you progress through the game. Chris Brown of New Zealand website Gameplanet said that the PC version "scratches an itch I didn't realise I had", finding it "simple, but not brainless" but also "fun as hell"; he also highlighted the user interface in their preview build as "awkward". In comparison to the 30-year-old original, Destructoid opined "the game isn't a true recreation; it's more Arrowhead's ideal take on it", finding that "while the content may feel sort of new, nothing's ever really that fresh with Gauntlet. And that's probably just the way that fans would want it." Dave Rudden of IGN praised the same PC version's four-player co-op while criticizing the repetitive gameplay and low replay value. Daniel Tack of Game Informer found the boss battles enjoyable but insufficient, and the PC version's level design bland and repetitive, describing it as a "sleepy, automated button mash". Michael P. Huber, of GameTrailers, praised the same PC version's four distinct classes while also criticizing the lack of varied environment and replay value.

Joshua Vanderwall of The Escapist gave the PC version three-and-a-half stars out of five, saying, "Arrowhead made a very true-to-source Gauntlet game, no doubt, but the source is 30 years old, and could use some modern accouterments. Gauntlet is as much fun as it has ever been, but it'll get old fast for those who still remember slogging through the original." Jed Pressgrove of Slant Magazine gave it an above-average review, saying that it was "nothing more than a modest cycle of action, never selling itself as a self-important well of features." However, David Jenkins of Metro gave it five out of ten, saying, "It's certainly not the worst Gauntlet revamp there's ever been, but there's too little substance or variety to satisfy either new fans or old."

References

External links
 
 

2014 video games
Action role-playing video games
Multiplayer and single-player video games
PlayStation 4 games
Video games about valkyries
Video games adapted into comics
Video games developed in Sweden
Video games featuring female protagonists
Video games using procedural generation
Warner Bros. video games
Windows games